Ruskington railway station serves the village of Ruskington in Lincolnshire, England. It opened in 1882 as part of the Great Northern and Great Eastern Joint Railway between Sleaford and Lincoln Central. It closed in 1961 but was reopened in 1975.

The station is now owned by Network Rail and managed by East Midlands Railway who provide all rail services.

The station is unstaffed and offers limited facilities other than free car parking, two shelters, bicycle storage, timetables and modern 'Help Points'. The full range of tickets for travel are purchased from the guard on the train at no extra cost, there are no retail facilities at this station.

In 2014 work was undertaken to improve access at the station. This included the construction of new railway bridges and disabled access ramps to safely cross the lines.  Previous access from one platform to the other was by crossing both railway lines.

Services
All services at Ruskington are operated by East Midlands Railway.

There is no Sunday service at the station.

References

External links

Railway stations in Lincolnshire
DfT Category F2 stations
Former Great Northern and Great Eastern Joint Railway stations
Railway stations served by East Midlands Railway
Railway stations in Great Britain opened in 1882
Railway stations in Great Britain closed in 1961
Railway stations in Great Britain opened in 1975
Reopened railway stations in Great Britain